The Ministry of Finance is a Portuguese government ministry.

History
The Ministry of Finance has its origins on the Comptrollerships of the Exchequer (vedorias da Fazenda) created in the 14th century to run the State's financial affairs. After 1584, the comptrollerships are replaced by the Council of the Court of the Exchequer (Conselho do Tribunal da Fazenda). In 1761, the Royal Treasury (Erário Régio) is created, and it becomes the central department of State Finance.

The modern Ministry of Finance is created in 1788, then under the designation of Secretary of State for the Affairs of the Exchequer (Secretaria de Estado dos Negócios da Fazenda). In 1849, it turns into the Ministry of the Exchequer Affairs (Ministério dos Negócios da Fazenda), or simply Ministry of the Exchequer (Ministério da Fazenda).

In 1910, following the republican coup d'état, the department is renamed Ministry of Finance (Ministério das Finanças). Since then, the ministry has almost always kept that name, except for some brief periods in which it was called Ministry of Finance and Economic Coordination (Ministério das Finanças e da Coordenação Económica) in March–May 1974, Ministry of Economic Coordination (Ministério da Coordenação Económica) in May–June 1974, Ministry of Finance and Planning (Ministério das Finanças e do Plano) in 1980–1983, or Ministry of Finance and Public Administration (Ministério das Finanças e Administração Pública) in 2002–2005.

Lista

References

External links
  

Portugal
Finance and Public Administration